Omondi is both a surname and a given name. It is most common with the Luo Tribe in East Africa. The name itself is given to Male children born early in the morning. Amondi is a female version of the name. It may refer to:

People with this name include:

Footballers
Eric Johanna Omondi (born 1994), Kenyan footballer
James Omondi (born 1980), Kenyan footballer and manager
Evans Omondi, Kenyan footballer
Jacob Omondi, Kenyan footballer
Kevin Omondi (footballer, born 1990), Kenyan footballer
Tyrus Omondi (born 1994), Kenyan footballer 
Phillip Omondi (1957–1999), Ugandan footballer and manager
Marvin Omondi, Kenyan footballer
Eric Omondi Ongao (born 1977), Kenyan footballer

Others
Michael Omondi (1961–2008), Kenyan field hockey player
Ted Omondi (born 1984), Kenyan rugby union player